Bosnia and Herzegovina competed at the 2014 Winter Olympics in Sochi, Russia, from 7 to 23 February 2014. The team consists of five athletes in three sports. The team marched in the opening ceremony wearing clothes that paid homage to the 30th anniversary of the 1984 Winter Olympics held in Sarajevo.

The selection of alpine skier Žana Novaković as flagbearer resulted in controversy as another skier, Igor Laikert, had better results. There were suggestions that this had to due with the ethnic divide in the country with Laikert coming from the Muslim-Croat community.

Alpine skiing 

According to the quota allocation released on 20 January 2014, Bosnia and Herzegovina had three athletes in qualification position.

Biathlon  

Bosnia and Herzegovina received a reallocation quota spot in biathlon. Tanja Karišik also competed in cross-country skiing.

Cross-country skiing 

According to the quota allocation released on 20 January 2014, Bosnia and Herzegovina had two athletes in qualification position.

Distance

Sprint

References

External links 
 
 

Nations at the 2014 Winter Olympics
2014 Winter Olympics
Olympics